National Secondary Route 251, or just Route 251 (or ) is a National Road Route of Costa Rica, located in the San José, Cartago provinces.

Description
In San José province the route covers Curridabat canton (Curridabat, Sánchez districts).

In Cartago province the route covers La Unión canton (Tres Ríos, San Juan, San Rafael districts).

References

Highways in Costa Rica